Anatoliy Kyrylovych Kinakh (born August 4, 1954) is a Ukrainian politician and honorary professor at the Mykolaiv Government Humanitarian University. Kinakh is a former (long serving) People's Deputy of Ukraine. Kinakh currently serves as the leader of Party of Industrialists and Entrepreneurs of Ukraine.

Previously, Kinakh was a Prime Minister from 2001 to 2002 under President Leonid Kuchma, a first vice-Prime Minister and a Minister of Economy of Ukraine. 
Since 1996 Anatoliy Kinakh has been the President of Ukrainian League of Industrialists and Entrepreneurs, non-governmental business organization.

Biography
Anatoliy Kinakh was born in the village of Brătușeni in the Moldavian SSR (now Moldova) on August 4, 1954. In 1978, he graduated from the Leningrad Shipbuilding Institute as a shipbuilding engineer. After finishing his higher education, Kinakh started his engineering career at the Tallinn shipyard. From 1981 he worked at the Mykolaiv shipyard Ocean.

Political career
In April 1990, he was elected to the Ukrainian parliament the Verkhovna Rada. There he worked on a committee dealing with economic reforms. In 1992, Kinakh was appointed as a representative of the President in the Mykolaiv Oblast (province) of southern Ukraine. In 1995, Anatoliy Kinakh was appointed Vice-Prime Minister of Ukraine in the Cabinet of Yevhen Marchuk concerned with industrial affairs.

In the early 1990s, Mr. Kinakh held several posts in the local government of Mykolayiv Oblast. From 1995 to 1996 Kinakh was the Minister of Industrial Policy.

Anatoliy Kinah was appointed as the Prime Minister of Ukraine from May 29, 2001 to November 21, 2002.

In 2002, he was elected to Verkhovna Rada on the list of the electoral bloc of parties For United Ukraine.

In the 2004 presidential election Anatoliy Kinakh was a candidate for the post of President of Ukraine, nominated by the Party of Industrialists and Entrepreneurs of Ukraine, which he has chaired since 2000. A particular feature of his election program is a pro-Ukrainian choice in foreign policy, saying that entry to the European Union should not be a barrier to the development of relationships with all Commonwealth of Independent States countries as well as with Russia.

During the election campaign, Kinakh publicly broke ties with government-backed candidate and then Prime Minister Viktor Yanukovych by declaring that no criminal can hold the post of President of Ukraine. He later took an active part in the Orange Revolution on the side of opposition leader Viktor Yushchenko (who was elected president). Kinakh was appointed First Vice Prime Minister in the first Tymoshenko Government Kinakh became Secretary of the National Security and Defense Council of Ukraine on September 27, 2005.

Kinakh was number two on the electoral list of the pro-presidential bloc Our Ukraine during the 2006 parliamentary election.

In March 2007, he became the Minister of Economics in the cabinet of Viktor Yanukovych against the wish of the Our Ukraine bloc. The Our Ukraine faction then decided to expel Anatoliy Kinakh from the faction and President Viktor Yushchenko ordered his removal from the National Security and Defense Council.

At the early parliamentary elections parliamentary on September 30, 2007, his party participated in the elections together with the Yanukovych-led Party of Regions. Kinakh was elected in parliament. He became a full member of Party of Regions in October 2008. In 2012 he was re-elected into parliament on the party list of Party of Regions.

On January 16, 2014 he voted for the laws that conflict with the Constitution of Ukraine, Convention about the protection of human rights and fundamental freedoms, obligations and duties of Ukraine as a member of the UNO, CE and OSCE.

On 25 February 2014 Kinakh and 32 other mostly former Party of Regions deputies created the parliamentary faction Economic Development.

In the 2014 parliamentary election Kinakh tried to win a constituency seat in Mykolaiv as an independent candidate, but failed after finishing second in the constituency with approximately 12.77% of votes (winner Borys Kozyr of Petro Poroshenko Bloc won 33.17% of the votes).

Kinakh did not participate in the 2019 Ukrainian parliamentary election.

References

External links

1954 births
Living people
People from Edineț District
Moldovan emigrants to Ukraine
Ukrainians in Moldova
Governors of Mykolaiv Oblast
Prime Ministers of Ukraine
Party of Industrialists and Entrepreneurs of Ukraine politicians
Party of Regions politicians
Candidates in the 2004 Ukrainian presidential election
Economy ministers of Ukraine
Secretaries of National Security and Defense Council of Ukraine
First vice prime ministers of Ukraine
21st-century Ukrainian politicians
Recipients of the Order of Prince Yaroslav the Wise, 4th class